Peregian Springs is a suburb in the Sunshine Coast Region, Queensland, Australia.

Geography 
The suburb is home to a large-scale housing estate of the same name which is being developed by FKP Property Group as part of a master-planned community.

There are 50 hectares of conservation areas to ensure habitat and breeding grounds for native fauna. A recovery plan for the Emu Mountain Sheoak and a dedicated nature corridor form part of the conservation effort.

The Ridges Peregian Springs residential development utilises a stormwater management system that includes the building of swales which are designed to provide treatment of run-off, moving water away from residential areas and using vegetation as a filter to reduce pollutants and improve water quality.

Peregian Springs Shopping Centre has rainwater tanks to collect rain run-off for irrigation and cleaning, and solar shading to reduce the need for air conditioning.

History 
Peregian is a Kabi Kabi word for emu or may derive from perridhan/jan meaning mangrove seeds. Nearby Mount Peregian was formerly known as Emu Mountain.

The first inhabitants of the Peregian Springs area were the Gubbi Gubbi people who lived off the abundant riches provided by the surrounding river systems. The Gubbi Gubbi was a matrilineal society with the woman’s name being given to the land and the tribe.

The first permanent white settlers arrived in the area around 1870. The early wealth in the area was created by timber and milling with a regular paddle steamer, the Culgoa, making three trips a fortnight from Noosa to Brisbane to deliver timber. It was wrecked on the Noosa Bar on 13 May 1891.

St Andrew's Anglican College was planned to commence construction in 2001 to open in 2002. However, the discovery of the endangered Wallum sedge frog (Litoria Olongburensis) on the site necessitated the revision of the school's master plan to protect the frog's natural habitat. Construction commenced in 2002 and the school was opened on 28 January 2003 by Archbishop of Brisbane, Phillip Aspinall. The school opened 161 students directed by principal Sue Hornum.

Peregian Springs State School commenced construction in April 2009. Gwen Sands was appointed principal to establish the school on 13 July 2009. Parents, friends and community members voted for the school's name through a wide consultation process involving the whole community. Ministerial approval for the school's name was received on 29 September 2009. The school opened on 27 January 2010 with 265 students attending on the first day. The school was officially opened by the Minister for Education and Training, Geoff Wilson on 12 February 2010. The school doubled in size in the first two years with 500 students enrolled by the end of 2011. During 2011, Stage 2 of the building program was completed giving the school another 8 classrooms and a science and technology classroom. Peregian Springs State School was awarded Independent Public School status in 2012. By 2017 the school had an indoor sports centre, outdoor courts and additional classrooms, common areas and playgrounds to accommodate more than 1,000 students.

Climate
The climate at Peregian Springs has:
Average solar irradiation: 4.90 kWh/m2/day
Average wind speed: 3.88 m/s
Average air temperature: 19.38 °C
Average earth temperature: 20.18 °C
Average humidity: 66.63
Average air pressure: 99.11 kPa

Education
Peregian Springs State School is a government primary (Prep-6) school for boys and girls at 191 The Avenue. In 2017, the school had an enrolment of 1,025 students with 73 teachers (62 full-time equivalent) and 41 non-teaching staff (24 full-time equivalent). In 2018, the school had an enrolment of 1,041 students with 73 teachers (65 full-time equivalent) and 41 non-teaching staff (25 full-time equivalent). It includes a special education program.

St Andrew's Anglican College is a private primary and secondary (Prep-12) school for boys and girls at 40 Peregian Springs Drive. In 2018, the school had an enrolment of 1,290 students with 103 teachers (96 full-time equivalent) and 91 non-teaching staff (62 full-time equivalent). The school has an associated early learning centre and day care facility called Little Saints which accepts children from six weeks old.

There is no government secondary school in Peregian Springs. The nearest government secondary school is Coolum State High School in neighbouring Coolum Beach to the east.

Amenities 

The Sunshine Coast Regional Council operates a mobile library service which visits the carpark of the shopping centre.

Integrated cycling and walk paths connect slow-speed street paths, forming a large network throughout the suburb.

The privately owned, 18-hole, 72-par Peregian Spring Golf Course is for members and guests only.

Events
Peregian Springs Pro-Am – "Metropolitan Tournament of the Year - 2007" - $50,000 prize money donated by FKP Limited.
The FKP Peregian Springs Series - In its seventh year, the series is the richest golf pro-am series in Australia and is attended by golf professionals from all over Australia and New Zealand.
Noosa Jazz Festival - Held late August to early September the event is spread across the Sunshine Coast region, with pivotal performances held in Peregian Springs.

References

Attribution
This article contains material from Peregian Springs State School > History © The State of Queensland, (Department of Education) 2021, released under CC BY 4.0 licence, retrieved 13 February 2022.

External links
 
 

Suburbs of the Sunshine Coast Region